Sowbagyavathi is a 1939 Indian, Tamil-language film directed by Prem Chetna.

Cast 
The following list was adapted from the book Thamizh Cinema Ulagam

Male cast
Aayiram Mugam Ramkumar  Judge Somu
G. Govindarajulu  Zamindar
P. V. Ethiraj  Vasu
S. V. Sahasranamam  Kittu
S. Krishna Sastry  Raoji Dewan
B. K. Subramania Chetty  Cashier
M. S. Murugesan  Murugesa Mudaliar
M. R. Subramaniam  Sastry
S. K. Muthukrishnan  Peon

Female cast
S. P. L. Dhanalakshmi  Meena
C. Padmavahi Bhai  Bhagyam
P. R. Mangalam  Rajamma
Gomathi Bhai  Ascetic
Saraswathi  Friend 
Leela  Friend
Padma  Friend
Sivakami  Friend

Production 
The film was produced by Lakshmi Film Company and was distributed by Kovai Premier Cinetone. Prem Chetna directed the film Aayiram Mugam Ramkumar wrote the story and the dialogues were written by G. Govindarajulu. While the Cinematography was done by J. S. Patel. D. Govindan did the editing. M. D. Rajaram handled audiography. R. Krishnan was in-charge of the laboratory.

Aayiram Mugam Ramkumar has featured in Chandrakantha, a 1936 film as Detective Govindan and has directed the 1940 film Balya Vivaham. Sivaji Ganesan was said to have been impressed by Ramkumar and named his first son after him.

Soundtrack 
The music was composed by G. Govindarajulu while the lyrics were penned by L. Nanjappa Chetty. The actors themselves sang all the songs.

References 

1930s Tamil-language films